"The Car" is a song written by Gary Heyde and C. Michael Spriggs, and recorded by American country music artist Jeff Carson.  It was released in October 1995 as the third single from his debut album Jeff Carson.  The song reached number three on the Billboard Hot Country Singles & Tracks chart in December 1995.

Content
The song is a ballad about a relationship between the narrator and his father. In the first verse, the narrator expresses desire for a Ford Mustang, but cannot get one due to his father being busy with work. The son nonetheless wants the car because it will offer "a chance to be with him".

In the second verse, the narrator says that he has let go of his dream of having a Mustang until he gets word that his father has died. He also finds that the father has left a note for him along with a set of keys for a Mustang. In the final chorus, the narrator states that "there will always be a part of us together in that car".

Critical reception
A review in Billboard was positive, praising Carson's "warm, affecting voice" while calling it "one of the most powerfully moving songs released this year."

Chart performance
"The Car" debuted at number 64 on the U.S. Billboard Hot Country Singles & Tracks for the week of October 7, 1995.

Year-end charts

References

1995 singles
1995 songs
Jeff Carson songs
Music videos directed by Michael Salomon
Curb Records singles
Songs written by Austin Gary
Songs about cars